"The First Time Ever I Saw Your Face" is a 1957 folk song written by British political singer-songwriter Ewan MacColl for Peggy Seeger, who later became his wife. At the time, the couple were lovers, although MacColl was still married to his second wife, Jean Newlove. Seeger sang the song when the duo performed in folk clubs around Britain. During the 1960s, it was recorded by various folk singers and became a major international hit for Roberta Flack in 1972, winning Grammy Awards for Record of the Year and Song of the Year. Billboard ranked it as the number one Hot 100 single of the year for 1972.

History
There are two differing accounts of the origin of the song. MacColl said that he wrote the song for Seeger after she asked him to pen a song for a play she was in. He wrote the song and taught it to Seeger over the telephone. Seeger said that MacColl, with whom she had begun an affair in 1957, used to send her tapes to listen to while they were apart and that the song was on one of them.

Peggy Seeger has said that MacColl had been challenged to write a love song (given that his repertoire was largely political) and this song was his response.

The earliest recording of the song was in 1960 by Bonnie Dobson, released in 1961 on her debut album She's Like a Swallow and Other Folk Songs. The song entered the pop mainstream the following year when it was released by the Kingston Trio on their 1962 hit album New Frontier and in subsequent years by other pop folk groups such as Peter, Paul and Mary, the Brothers Four, Joe and Eddie, the Chad Mitchell Trio, and by Gordon Lightfoot on his debut album Lightfoot! (1966).

MacColl made no secret of the fact that he disliked all of the cover versions of the song. His daughter-in-law wrote: "He hated all of them. He had a special section in his record collection for them, entitled 'The Chamber of Horrors'. He said that the Elvis version was like Romeo at the bottom of the Post Office Tower singing up to Juliet. And the other versions, he thought, were travesties: bludgeoning, histrionic, and lacking in grace."

Roberta Flack version

The song was popularised by Roberta Flack in 1969 in a version that became a breakout hit for the singer.

Flack knew the song from the Joe & Eddie version which appeared on that folk duo's 1963 album Coast to Coast (as "The First Time"), Flack's friend singer Donal Leace having brought the track to Flack's attention. Having taught the song to the young girls in the glee club at Banneker High School (Washington D.C.), Flack would regularly perform "The First Time Ever I Saw Your Face" in her set-list at the Pennsylvania Avenue club Mr Henry's where Flack was hired as resident singer in 1968. In February 1969, Flack would record the song for her debut album First Take. Flack's rendition  was much slower-paced than Seeger's original, Flack's take running more than twice the two and a half minute length of Seeger's. Flack would recall that when she made her studio recording of "The First Time...", she felt the loss of her pet cat, which had been run over and died.

Flack's slow and sensual version was used by Clint Eastwood in his 1971 directorial film debut: Play Misty for Me to score a love scene featuring Eastwood and actress Donna Mills. Flack would recall how Eastwood, who had heard her version of "The First Time<span style="font-size=50%>...</span>" on his car radio while driving down the LA Freeway, phoned out of the blue to her Alexandria (Virginia) home: (Roberta Flack quote:)"[Eastwood said:] 'I'd like to use your song in this movie...about a disc jockey [with] a lot of music in it. I'd use it in the only part of the movie where there's absolute love.' I said okay. We discussed the money.[Eastwood would pay $2000 to use Flack's "The First Time..."] He said: 'Anything else?' And I said: 'I want to do it over again. It's too slow.' He said: "No, it's not.'"

Flack also recalled that during the First Take sessions, her producer Joel Dorn had suggested re-recording "The First Time<span style="font-size=50%>...</span>" with a slightly faster tempo and lyric edit to trim its running time, but Flack did not agree: (Roberta Flack quote:)"Joel said: 'Okay you don't care if it's a hit or not?' I said: 'No sir.' Of course he was right for three years, until [after] Clint got it."    Flack's version of "The First Time<span style="font-size=50%>...</span>" exploded in popularity following the November 1971 release of Play Misty For Me. This persuaded Atlantic Records to issue the track as a single - trimmed by a minute - in February 1972: the track became a smash hit single in the United States, reaching No. 1 for six weeks on both the Billboard Hot 100 and easy listening charts in the spring of 1972, with a No. 4 R&B chart peak. Reaching No. 14 on the UK Singles Chart, Flack's "The First Time<span style="font-size=50%>...</span>" was No. 1 for three weeks on the singles chart in Canada's RPM magazine.

"The First Time Ever I Saw Your Face" was played as the wake-up music on flight day 9 to the astronauts aboard Apollo 17 on their last day in Lunar orbit (Friday, December 15, 1972) before returning to Earth, thus ending the last human explorations of the Moon. The use of the song was most likely a reference to the "face" of the Moon below the spacecraft.

Chart history

Weekly charts
Roberta Flack

Year-end charts

All-time charts

Celine Dion

Leona Lewis

Matt Cardle

See also
List of Billboard Hot 100 number-one singles of 1972
List of number-one adult contemporary singles of 1972 (U.S.)
List of number-one singles in Australia during the 1970s
List of number-one singles of 1972 (Canada)

References

External links
 Superseventies.com - with quotes from Roberta Flack and information on the song's background
 
 

1957 songs
1972 singles
2000 singles
Songs written by Ewan MacColl
Roberta Flack songs
Celine Dion songs
The Kingston Trio songs
Peter, Paul and Mary songs
We Five songs
Andy Williams songs
Billboard Hot 100 number-one singles
Cashbox number-one singles
Number-one singles in Australia
RPM Top Singles number-one singles
Grammy Award for Record of the Year
Grammy Award for Song of the Year
Atlantic Records singles
A&M Records singles
Pop ballads
Vocal jazz songs
Richard Marx songs